Conor Boylan (born 22 March 1998) is an Irish hurler who plays for Limerick Senior Championship club Na Piarsaigh and at inter-county level with the Limerick senior hurling team. He usually lines out as a left wing-forward.

Playing career

Ardscoil Rís

Boylan first came to prominence as a hurler with Ardscoil Rís in Limerick. On 20 February 2016, he was at right wing-forward when Ardscoil Rís won the Harty Cup title after an 0-11 to 0-08 defeat of Our Lady’s Secondary School from Templemore in the final.

University College Cork

On 23 February 2019, Boylan was a substitute for University College Cork when they faced Mary Immaculate College in the Fitzgibbon Cup final. He remained on the bench for the 2-21 to 0-13 victory.

Boylan played in a second successive Fitzgibbon Cup final on 12 February 2020. Lining out at centre-forward, he ended the game with a second successive winners' medal after the 0-18 to 2-11 defeat of the Institute of Technology, Carlow.

Na Piarsaigh

Boylan joined the Na Piarsaigh club at a young age and played in all grades at juvenile and underage levels, enjoying championship success in the under-16, minor and under-21 grades.

Boylan won a Limerick Championship medal as a non-playing substitute on 11 October 2015 after a 1-22 to 4-12 defeat of Patrickswell in the final. Later that season he won a Munster Championship medal, also as a non-playing substitute, after a 2-18 to 2-11 defeat of Ballygunner. On 17 March 2016, Boylan was on the bench when he won an All-Ireland medal when Na Piarsaigh defeated Ruairí Óg by 2-25 to 2-14 in the final. 

On 15 October 2017, Boylan won a second Limerick Championship medal after being introduced as a substitute when Na Piarsaigh defeated Kilmallock by 1-22 to 2-14 in the final. He later won a second Munster Championship medal from midfield when Na Piarsaigh defeated Ballygunner by 3-15 to 2-10 in the final. On 17 March 2018, Boylan played as a substitute when Na Piarsaigh were defeated by Cuala in the All-Ireland final.

On 27 October 2018, Boylan won a third Limerick Championship medal at left wing-forward following Na Piarsaigh's 2-22 to 3-10 defeat of Doon.

Limerick

Minor and under-21

Boylan made his first appearance for the Limerick minor team on 8 April 2015. He was introduced as a substitute in a 2-20 to 1-13 defeat by Cork in the Munster Championship. On 12 July Boylan was again introduced as a substitute in Limerick's 0-20 to 0-17 defeat by Tipperary in the Munster final.

Boylan was eligible for the minor grade again in 2016 and made his first start on 6 April in a 2-11 to 1-08 defeat of Clare. On 10 July, he scored two points from left wing-forward when Limerick suffered a 1-24 to 0-10 defeat by Tipperary in a second successive Munster final. On 4 September, Boyle was at right corner-forward when Limerick suffered a second defeat by Tipperary in the All-Ireland final at Croke Park. 

Boylan subsequently progressed onto the Limerick under-21 hurling team and won a Munster Championship medal on 26 July 2017 after a coming on as a substitute in Limerick's 0-16 to 1-11 defeat of Cork in the final. On 9 September, he was introduced as a 38th-minute substitute for Cian Lynch in Limerick's 0-17 to 0-11 defeat of Kilkenny in the All-Ireland final.

Senior

Boylan made his first appearance for the Limerick senior team on 14 December 2018. He was introduced as a 55th-minute substitute for Barry O'Connell in a 4-14 to 2-17 defeat by Tipperary in the Munster League. On 2 February 2019, he made his first start at left wing-forward in a 1-21 to 1-14 defeat of Tipperary.

Career statistics

Honours

Ardscoil Rís
Dr Harty Cup (1): 2016

University College Cork
Fitzgibbon Cup (2): 2019, 2020

Na Piarsaigh
All-Ireland Senior Club Hurling Championship (1): 2016
Munster Senior Club Hurling Championship (2): 2015, 2017
Limerick Senior Hurling Championship (4): 2015, 2017, 2018, 2020

Limerick
All-Ireland Senior Hurling Championship (1): 2020
Munster Senior Hurling Championship (3): 2019, 2020, 2021
National Hurling League (2): 2019, 2020
All-Ireland Under-21 Hurling Championship (1): 2017
Munster Under-21 Hurling Championship (1): 2017

References

1998 births
Living people
Limerick inter-county hurlers
Na Piarsaigh (Limerick) hurlers
UCC hurlers